Berks, Bucks and Oxon Premier A was an English rugby union league featuring teams from Berkshire, Buckinghamshire and Oxfordshire.

Berks/Bucks & Oxon Premier A Honours

References

See also
English Rugby Union Leagues
English rugby union system
Rugby union in England

Rugby union in Oxfordshire
Rugby union in Berkshire
Rugby union in Buckinghamshire
Defunct rugby union leagues in England